Imperial Unified School District is a public school district based in Imperial County, California, United States.

External links
 Official district website

School districts in Imperial County, California